Laurynas Ivinskis (1810-1881) was a Lithuanian teacher, publisher, translator and lexicographer, from a Samogitian noble family. He is notable for a series of annual calendars published between 1847 and 1877, in which he summarized the daily life of Samogitian peasantry. He also published literary works by some of the most renowned local authors. He was the first to publish Antanas Baranauskas' most famous work, Anyksčių Šilelis.

Biography

Ivinskis was born in Bambaliai on 15 August 1810. In 1841 Ivinskis passed the teacher's exams, and soon afterwards he received a Kaunas city teacher's certificate. He prepared the first Lithuanian calendar back in 1845, however due to lack of funds the calendar was not printed in Vilnius until a year later. His calendar Metu skajtlus ukiszkas ant metu Wieszpaties circulated until the Lithuanian press ban in 1864. The calendars were a form of an almanach, informing the readers of upcoming fairs and festivities, but also of basic news on medicine, veterinary science, agriculture and housekeeping. From 1852 they also included a literary section. Out of 22 Lithuanian language calendars published between 1847 and 1864, and then again in 1877, three were in Cyrillic, while the remaining 19 were in the Latin alphabet, used by most people for the Lithuanian language. As publishing books and newspapers in Lithuanian was banned by the tsarist authorities, Ivinskis' calendars served the role of press for a large number of Lithuanian speakers. During the ban, Ivinskis lectured in a secret Lithuanian school, established in Lubiai.

Ivinskis settled in Rietavas and lived there between 1874 and 1878. During this period he wrote a book entitled Pasauga, which is considered as one of the first Lithuanian books dedicated to the theme of environmental protection. Apart from publishing his calendars, Ivinskis was also an active translator from German and English. He also started working on a Polish-Lithuanian and Russian-Lithuanian dictionary, as well as numerous works in the Polish language. Ivinskis died on August 29, 1881, and was buried in Kuršėnai.

External links
 Biography and works 

1810 births
1881 deaths
Lithuanian publishers (people)
Lithuanian translators
Lithuanian schoolteachers
Lithuanian lexicographers
Translators to Lithuanian
People from Kelmė District Municipality
19th-century translators
19th-century lexicographers